Nikola Kuga (born October 13, 1986 ) is a Serbian professional basketball player. Standing at 2.00 m (6  ft 7 in), he plays the Small Forward position.

Professional career
Nikola grew up in the famous basketball school of FMP Belgrade, he played for youth teams of FMP from 2005 to 2007. In the 2007–08 season, he played for KK Srem.

In Sempteber 2008, Kuga signed a one-year deal with Sport Plazza Casablanca (Morocco). In 2009–10 season, he played for Hopsi Pozela. From 2010 to 2015, he has played for several European basketball teams including U.M.F. Skallagrímur (Iceland), Tallina Kalev (Estonia), Umea (Sweden), BBG Herford (Germany).

Outside Europe, he has suited up for a number of the teams such as Al Moutahed (Lebanon), Al Sarjah (UAE), R.L.C (Maldeves).

Inn 2010, Kuga signed with Skallagrímur in the Icelandic 1. deild karla. In four games, he averaged 12.3 points and 7.0 rebounds per game before leaving the club in November 2010.

In 2011, Kuga signed with Cucuta Norte, a professional basketball club based in Cucuta, Colombia. He became the first Serbian and first player from Eastern Europe to play in the Colombian league (LNB – Colombia). Over 24 league games Kuga averaged 15.3 points, 5.4 rebounds and 3.0 assists per game.

In August 2014, Laskar Dreya South Sumatra team announced that Kuga will play for Laskar Dreaya in ASEAN Basketball League. He has become first European player who got chance to Play ABL. On April 1, 2015, he signed for Diamond Valley Eagles and Australia become his 5th continent where he played.

In January 2016, Kuga signed a contract with Lebanese team Al Moutahed for the rest of the following season.

During 2016-2017, Kuga played for Portuguese team BC Alfenense.
Currently Kuga is member of Norvegian basketball team Ammerud Basket

References

 Interview with Nikola Kuga-May 29, 2012 by Eurobasket Center
 Nikola Kuga gets MVP of South East Asia Championship (in English) Jan 8, 2013 by Eurobasket Center
 La curiosa marca de Nikola Kuga(in Spanish) 16 Abr 2015 by 
 NIKOLA KUGA, EL MUNDO ES UNA GRAN PELOTA NARANJA-(in Spanish) 27 de Mayo de 2016 by  Arturasbasket
 Nikola Kuga (ex Diamond V.E.) signs at Schwenningen(in English) Dec 7, 2015 by Eurobasket
 Interview with Nikola Kuga (in English) June 6, 2018 by Eurobasket
 Interview with Nikola Kuga (in English) May 27, 2018 by Eurobasket

External links
 Nikola Kuga at fiba.com
 Nikola Kuga at eurobasket.com
 Nikola Kuga at aseanbasketballleague.com
 Nikola Kuga at basketball.realgm.com
 Letnje lige za profesionalce-(in Serbian) 28 maj 2011 by Kosarka24
 Icelandic statistics at kki.is

1986 births
Living people
BC Tallinn Kalev players
Croatian men's basketball players
KK FMP (1991–2011) players
KK Srem players
Serbian men's basketball players
Serbian expatriate basketball people in Australia
Serbian expatriate basketball people in Colombia
Serbian expatriate basketball people in Estonia
Serbian expatriate basketball people in Germany
Serbian expatriate basketball people in Iceland
Serbian expatriate basketball people in Indonesia
Serbian expatriate basketball people in Lebanon
Serbian expatriate basketball people in Portugal 
Serbian expatriate basketball people in the Maldives
Serbian expatriate basketball people in Morocco
Serbian expatriate basketball people in Norway
Serbian expatriate basketball people in the United States
Serbian expatriate basketball people in the United Arab Emirates
People from Bihać
Skallagrímur men's basketball players
Small forwards
Serbs of Bosnia and Herzegovina